Namuka is an uninhabited islet in Shefa Province of Vanuatu in the Pacific Ocean. The island is a part of Shepherd Islands archipelago.

Geography
Namuka lies off the southern shore of Epi Island and has white-sand beaches and a fringing coral reef.

References

Islands of Vanuatu
Shefa Province
Uninhabited islands of Vanuatu